The Lockheed Model 12 Electra Junior, more commonly known as the Lockheed 12 or L-12, is an eight-seat, six-passenger all-metal twin-engine transport aircraft of the late 1930s designed for use by small airlines, companies, and wealthy private individuals. A smaller version of the Lockheed Model 10 Electra, the Lockheed 12 was not popular as an airliner but was widely used as a corporate and government transport. Several were also used for testing new aviation technologies.

Design and development

After Lockheed had introduced its 10-passenger Model 10 Electra, the company decided to develop a smaller version which would be better suited as a "feeder airliner" or a corporate executive transport. At the same time, the U.S. Bureau of Air Commerce had also sensed the need for a small feeder airliner and announced a design competition for one. In order for a candidate to qualify for the competition, a prototype had to fly by June 30, 1936.

Lockheed based its candidate, which it named the Model 12 Electra Junior, around a scaled down Electra. It would carry only six passengers and two pilots but would use the same  Pratt & Whitney R-985 Wasp Junior SB radial engines as the main Electra version, the 10A. Like the Electra, the Model 12 had an all-metal structure, trailing-edge wing flaps, low-drag NACA engine cowlings, and two-bladed controllable-pitch propellers (later changed to constant-speed propellers). It also had the Electra's twin tail fins and rudders, which were becoming a Lockheed trademark. The landing gear was a conventional tail-dragger arrangement, with the main wheels retracting backwards into the engine nacelles; as was often the case with retractable gear of the period, the wheel bottoms were left exposed in case a wheels-up emergency landing was necessary, or the pilot simply forgot to deploy his novel landing gear.

As in the Electra and the Boeing 247, the Model 12's main wing spar passed through the passenger cabin; small steps were placed on either side of the spar to ease passenger movement. The cabin had a lavatory in the rear. Although the standard cabin layout was for six passengers, Lockheed also offered roomier, more luxurious layouts for corporate or private owners.

The new transport had its first flight on June 27, 1936, three days before the competition deadline, at 12:12 PM local time, a time deliberately chosen for the Model 12's number. As it turned out, the other two competition entries, the Beechcraft Model 18 and the Barkley-Grow T8P-1, weren't ready in time for the deadline, so Lockheed won by default. The "Electra Junior" name did not catch on in the way that the original Electra's name had. Most users simply referred to the aircraft by its model number, as the Lockheed 12.

The original Lockheed 12 version, with Wasp Junior engines, was the Model 12A. Almost every Lockheed 12 built was a 12A or derived from the 12A. There was also a Model 12B, using  Wright R-975-E3 Whirlwind radials, but only two of this model were built. Although Lockheed had also announced a Model 12F, powered by Wright R-760 Whirlwind seven-cylinder radials, and a Model 12M, powered by  Menasco six-cylinder inline engines, neither of these versions reached production.

Operational history

Even though the Lockheed 12 had won the government's feeder airliner competition, most of the airlines rejected it, and very few Lockheed 12s were used as airliners. One notable airline user was the newly renamed Continental Air Lines, which had a fleet of three Lockheed 12s that ran on its route between Denver, Colorado and El Paso, Texas in the late 1930s. Another was British West Indian Airways Ltd., which flew the Lockheed 12 on Caribbean routes in the Lesser Antilles during the mid-1940s.

The Lockheed 12 proved much more popular as a transport for company executives or government officials. Oil and steel companies were among the major users. A number were purchased as military staff transports by the United States Army Air Corps, which designated the type as the C-40, and by the United States Navy, which used the designation JO, or in one peculiar case, R3O-2. With the arrival of World War II, many civilian Lockheed 12s were requisitioned by the U.S. Army and Navy, Britain's Royal Air Force, and the Royal Canadian Air Force.

Two civil Lockheed 12s ordered by British Airways Ltd. were actually intended for covert military reconnaissance flights. Sidney Cotton modified these aircraft for aerial photography and in civilian guise, overflew and surreptitiously photographed many German and Italian military installations during the months preceding World War II.

The main military user of the Lockheed 12 was the Royal Netherlands East Indies Army Air Force, which bought 36. Sixteen of these were the Model 212, a version created by Lockheed for training bomber crews, which had a  caliber machine gun in an unpowered, partly retractable gun turret on top of the fuselage, a second .303-caliber machine gun fixed in the nose, and bomb racks under the wing center section that could hold eight  bombs. The other 20 aircraft were transport versions.

Several Lockheed 12s were used as technology testbeds. The U.S. National Advisory Committee for Aeronautics (NACA) bought two, adding a center vertical fin to each of them to test stability improvements. One of the NACA Lockheed 12s was used to test "hot-wing" deicing technology, in which hot exhaust air from the engines was ducted through the wing's leading edge to prevent ice accumulation.

Three other Lockheed 12s were used to test tricycle landing gear. These had their normal landing gear replaced by a non-retracting version with a large nosewheel and with the main wheels shifted further back on the engine nacelles. (The tailwheel from the normal conventional gear was retained.) The gear was non-retractable because there wasn't room within the structure to stow it in retracted position. Streamlined fairings were placed on the gear to reduce drag. Another went to the U.S. Army as the C-40B, and still another was retained by Lockheed for its own testing; both of these were eventually converted back to the normal landing gear configuration.

Milo Burcham flew a Lockheed 12A in the 1937 Bendix Trophy Race from Burbank, California to Cleveland, Ohio. This 12A had extra fuel tanks in the cabin, allowing it to save time by making the entire  trip non-stop.

Another Lockheed 12A, owned by Republic Oil Company and named The Texan, was modified by aviator Jimmie Mattern for a round-the-world flight attempt. Mattern filled the 12A's cabin with fuel tanks and removed the cabin windows and door; the crew would enter the aircraft via a cockpit hatch. The aircraft was denied a U.S. permit for the flight following the Earhart incident; however, it was pressed into action in September 1937 in a long range search effort for Sigizmund Levanevsky, who crashed somewhere between the North pole and Barrow, Alaska. "The Texan" was outfitted as a luxury transport afterward, and lost in a hangar fire in January 1938.

Lockheed built a total of 130 Lockheed 12s, ending production in 1941. With the arrival of World War II, Lockheed concentrated its production efforts on more advanced military aircraft, such as the Hudson bomber and the P-38 Lightning twin-engined fighter. The Lockheed 12's market was left to the Beechcraft Model 18, thousands of which would eventually be produced.

A number of Lockheed 12s have survived to the present day, mostly in private hands. Several of these are still flying.

Variants

Civil models

Model 12A
Powered by two  Pratt & Whitney R-985 Wasp Junior SB radial engines. 70 built.
Model 12B
Like 12A, but powered by two  Wright R-975-E3 Whirlwind radial engines. This was a normal civil model, but the only two built (serial numbers 1228 and 1249) went to the Argentine Army.
Model 12-25
Last two civilian Model 12's produced (serial numbers 1293 and 1294), same as 12A but with Pratt & Whitney R-985 Wasp Junior SB3 engines.

Military models

All of these were based on the Model 12A and used the same engines.
C-40
U.S. Army Air Corps five-passenger transport; prototype (serial 1247) converted from company owned 12A, two others built, redesignated UC-40 in January 1943.
C-40A
U.S. Army Air Corps transport with mixed passenger/cargo interior; 10 built, plus one converted from C-40B, redesignated UC-40A in January 1943.
C-40B
U.S. Army Air Corps testbed for testing fixed tricycle landing gear; one built, converted to a normal C-40A in 1940.
C-40D
Eleven civil Model 12As impressed by the U.S. Army Air Forces in 1942, with standard six-passenger interior. Redesignated UC-40D in January 1943.
JO-1
U.S. Navy five-passenger transport; one built.
JO-2
U.S. Navy and Marine Corps six-passenger transport; five built.
XJO-3
U.S. Navy testbed with fixed tricycle gear, used for carrier landing tests and airborne radar trials; one built.
R3O-2
One civil Model 12A impressed by the U.S. Navy in 1941. (This was an anomalous designation, since the Navy had already used R3O for the Model 10 Electra.)
Model 212
Bomber trainer with bomb racks and gun turret atop aft fuselage; prototype (serial 1243, reserialed 212-13) converted from company owned 12A, 16 others built, one prototype and 16 for the Royal Netherlands East Indies Army Air Force.
Model 12-26
Military transport version of the Model 212; 20 built for the Royal Netherlands East Indies Army Air Force.

Operators

Civilian

 Aeronorte
 Aerovias Brasil
 Associated Airlines (Australia)
 British West Indian Airways Ltd.
 British Airways Ltd. (a front for the espionage of Sidney Cotton)
 Continental Air Lines (formerly Varney Air Transport)
 Mercer Airlines (Burbank, CA)
 Cruzeiro do Sul
 National Advisory Committee for Aeronautics (NACA)
 Panair do Brasil
 Canadian Department of Transport
 Brazilian Ministry of Aeronautics
 Santa Maria Airlines

Military

 Argentine Army

 Brazilian Air Force

 Royal Canadian Air Force

 Indonesian Air Force

 Royal Netherlands Air Force

 Royal Netherlands East Indies Army Air Force

 South African Air Force

 Royal Air Force

 United States Army Air Corps/United States Army Air Forces
 United States Marine Corps
 United States Navy

Aircraft on display

 A Model 12A (Canadian registration CF-CCT, Lockheed construction number 1219) is on display at the Canada Aviation Museum in Ottawa, Ontario. This aircraft was operated by Canada's Department of Transport from 1937 until 1963 and surveyed the route of the Trans-Canada Airway. In 1937 it made the first same-day flight from Montreal, Quebec to Vancouver, British Columbia, making five stops en route.
 A former U.S. Army Air Corps C-40A (U.S. Army serial number 38-540, U.S. civil registration N93R, Lockheed construction number 1257) is on display at the Yanks Air Museum in Chino, California.
 A Royal Netherlands Air Force Lockheed 12A c/n 1306 is on static display at the Soesterberg Nationaal Militair Museum in Soesterberg, Netherlands
 A former Royal Netherlands Air Force Lockheed 12-26 c/n 1313 is on static display at Arlanda Flygsamlingar, near Stockholm-Arlanda airport. Swedish airline Airtaco acquired the aircraft in 1953 for newspaper freights. Registration SE-BXU was reserved but was never accepted into the registry. Donated to Arlanda Flygsamlingar in 1990.
 An Indonesian Air Force Lockheed 12A registration number T-303 is on static display at Suryadarma Air Force Base in Subang Regency, Indonesia

Specifications (Model 12A)

Notable appearances in media
A Lockheed 12 appeared as the French airliner in the climactic final scene from the 1942 film Casablanca. (The aircraft carries the Air France seahorse logo, although Air France did not actually operate the type 12A). A "cut-out" stood in for a real Lockheed 12 in many shots. No real aircraft appeared in the movie. Half and quarter scale models were used instead.

Lockheed 12s have also appeared in movies as stand-ins for the Electra 10E used by Amelia Earhart in her round-the-world flight attempt. Two played this role in the NBC 1976 TV miniseries Amelia Earhart, and another did so in the 2009 movie Amelia.

See also

References

Notes

Citations

Bibliography
 Blankenburg, Kent. "Lockheed's Baby Electra". Flight Journal, April 2000.
 Bowers, Peter. "History of the Lockheed 12A." Flight Journal, April 2000.
 Davisson, Budd. "Lockheed 12A: Flying The Electra's Kid". airbum.com, 1989.
 Francillon, René J. Lockheed Aircraft Since 1913. London: Putnam, 1982.  .
 "Inspection Handbook Part 4, pp. 31–32." Federal Aviation Administration.
 O'Leary, Michael. "Junior Bomber." Air Classics, December 2001.
 O'Leary, Michael. "Shining Stars (Part Two)." Air Classics, December 2001 Another detailed history of the Lockheed 12. (Note: The online article has combined it with the subarticle: "Junior Bomber".)
 
 "A Smaller Lockheed 'Twin'." Flight, Volume XXIX, Issue 1415, February 6, 1936, p. 148.  Brief announcement and description of the Lockheed 12, published before the type's first flight.
 "Type Certificate Data Sheet TC 616." Federal Aviation Administration.

External links

 Lockheed 12-A (also: C-40, JO)
 Lockheed JO Electra Junior, R2O Electra, R3O Electra and Electra Junior

Electra Junior
1930s United States airliners
1930s United States civil utility aircraft
Low-wing aircraft
Aircraft first flown in 1936
Twin piston-engined tractor aircraft
Twin-tail aircraft